Guildfordia yoka, the yoka star turban, is a species of deep-water sea snail, a marine gastropod mollusk in the family Turbinidae, the turban snails.

Distribution and habitat

Description
The color pattern of the shell varies from very light brownish to purple-brown. Some specimens contain only 6 whorls instead of 7 as in the holotype. The upper whorls are smooth, then follows the body whorl with scarcely 2 rows of granules, instead of 7 or 8. Towards the keel it has very irregular radiating ribs, which leave however a nearly smooth zone above the keel, with only a few spiral striae.

The base of the shell is less convex than the upper part. Some specimens lack the rose-coloured line round the umbilical callosity. The aperture is oval, thick, with the nucleus in the external lower corner. The outer surface is slightly rugose, by irregular wrinkles, almost parallel with the basal margin of the operculum. The nucleus is marked by an olive spot.

Biology
Embryos of Guildfordia yoka develop into free-swimming planktonic larvae with several bands of cilia (trocophore). Later they develop into juvenile veligers, finally into fully grown adults.

Gallery

References

 Alf A. & Kreipl K. (2011) The family Turbinidae. Subfamilies Turbininae Rafinesque, 1815 and Prisogasterinae Hickman & McLean, 1990. In: G.T. Poppe & K. Groh (eds), A Conchological Iconography. Hackenheim: Conchbooks. pp. 1–82, pls 104–245.

Further reading

External links 

 Guildfordia yoka on OBIS
 

yoka
Gastropods described in 1899